Varbad-e Olya (also Romanized as Varbād-e ‘Olyā; also known as Varbād-e Bālā) is a village in Chenarud-e Shomali Rural District, Chenarud District, Chadegan County, Isfahan Province, Iran. At the 2006 census, its population was 163, in 34 families.

References 

Populated places in Chadegan County